Joe Davies (born 13 November 1995) is a Welsh rugby union player who plays for the Dragons regional team as a lock forward having previously played for Bedwas RFC and Newport RFC. He is a Wales under-20 international.

References

External links 
Dragons profile

Rugby union players from Newport, Wales
Welsh rugby union players
Dragons RFC players
Living people
1995 births
Bedwas RFC players
Newport RFC players
Rugby union locks